Slaven Stanković (born January 5, 1982) is a retired Serbian football player who played as a midfielder.

He started playing at FK Rudar Kosovska Mitrovica in the season 1998–99. He then moved to FK Zemun and played in the First League of FR Yugoslavia.

References

Living people
1982 births
Footballers from Belgrade
Serbian footballers
Serbian expatriate footballers
Association football midfielders
FK Zemun players
FK Voždovac players
FK Jedinstvo Ub players
Khazar Lankaran FK players
FK Vardar players
FK Sevojno players
PFC Beroe Stara Zagora players
FK Napredak Kruševac players
FK Kolubara players
Serbian SuperLiga players
First Professional Football League (Bulgaria) players
Expatriate footballers in Azerbaijan
Expatriate footballers in Bulgaria
Expatriate footballers in North Macedonia
Serbian expatriate sportspeople in Azerbaijan
Serbian expatriate sportspeople in Bulgaria
Serbian expatriate sportspeople in North Macedonia